Mario Rodríguez Cervantes (born 18 January 1978) is a Mexican former footballer.  , he played for Lobos BUAP as a goalkeeper. During a game against Chivas Guadalajara and C.F. Pachuca he passed the ball to the opposite team and they ended up making goals from Gonzalo Pineda and from Christian Gimenez. Since these incidents he has been working hard to recover his form to be in the starting line-up.

After Jose de Jesus Corona was sold to Cruz Azul, Mario became the starting goalkeeper for Estudiantes Tecos for the start of Apertura 2009.

InterLiga 2008 
The InterLiga 2008, so far for Mario Rodríguez has been great having gotten three Clean Sheets in all three games he has played, and he was back in form to be the First-Choice Goalkeeper of Club Atlas. Unfortunately, with the purchase of Uruguay goalkeeper Jorge Bava, he has been relegated to the bench.

External links
 Mario Rodríguez (Mario Rodríguez Cervantes) at MedioTiempo.com (in Spanish)
 

1978 births
Living people
Footballers from Coahuila
Liga MX players
Atlas F.C. footballers
Club Puebla players
Tecos F.C. footballers
Lobos BUAP footballers
Association football goalkeepers
Sportspeople from Torreón
Mexican footballers